Naeem Akhtar (born 2 December 1967) is a former Pakistani cricketer. Akhtar was a right-handed batsman who bowled right-arm fast-medium.

Akhtar made his first-class debut for Rawalpindi against Peshawar in the 1990/91 season. Akhtar represented the main Rawalpindi team in first-class cricket from 1990/91 to 2003/04 in 57 first-class matches, as well as Rawalpindi A and Rawalpindi A. He also represented Khan Research Laboratories in 32 first-class matches. His final first-class match came in the 2003/04 season for Rawalpindi against Quetta. Throughout his first-class career, Akhtar was noted as a consistent all-rounder. With the bat he scored 3,013 runs at a batting average of 21.99, with 10 half centuries and 2 centuries, one of which included his career first-class high score of 157* against Allied Bank Limited in the 1998/99 season. With the ball, he took 322 wickets at an impressive bowling average of 21.46, with 17 five wicket hauls and 2 ten wicket hauls, one of which came when he took 10 wickets in a single innings against Peshawar in 1995/96.

Akhtar also made his debut in List A cricket for Rawalpindi in the 1990/91 season against Peshawar. Akhtar represented the main Rawalpindi team in List A cricket 50 times from the 1990/91 to 2000/01 season. In addition, he also represented Rawalpindi A in 11 matches and Khan Research Laboratories in 35 matches from the 1997/98 to 2001/02 season. During the 1999 English cricket season, Akhtar played a single List A match for Cornwall against Cumberland in the 1999 NatWest Trophy. He also played a single MCCA Knockout Trophy match against the Somerset Cricket Board. In 2002, he played a single List A match for the Derbyshire Cricket Board against the Middlesex Cricket Board in the 1st round of the 2003 Cheltenham & Gloucester Trophy, which was held in 2002; This was his final List A match. In his total of 99 List A matches, he scored 1,430 runs at an average of 21.34, with a 6 half centuries and a high score of 81. With the ball he took 123 wickets at an average of 23.83, with a single five wicket haul which gave him best figures of 5/20.

Despite a notable career in domestic cricket, Akhtar never represented the Pakistan national cricket team, although he did make a single List A appearance for Pakistan A in December 1995 against England A.

References

External links
Naeem Akhtar at Cricinfo
Naeem Akhtar at CricketArchive

1967 births
Living people
Cricketers from Faisalabad
Rawalpindi cricketers
Khan Research Laboratories cricketers
Cornwall cricketers
Derbyshire Cricket Board cricketers
Rawalpindi B cricketers
Cricketers who have taken ten wickets in an innings